Gheorghe Boroi (born 26 August 1964) is a retired hurdler from Romania. He competed in the 110 m event at the 1992 and 1996 Olympics, but failed to reach the finals. He won a silver medal at the 1994 European Indoor Championships in the 60 m hurdles.

Achievements

References

1964 births
Living people
Romanian male hurdlers
Athletes (track and field) at the 1992 Summer Olympics
Athletes (track and field) at the 1996 Summer Olympics
Olympic athletes of Romania